The 1990 WAFU Club Championship was the fourteenth football club tournament season that took place for the runners-up or third place of each West African country's domestic league, the West African Club Championship. It was won by Ivory Coast's ASEC Abidjan after defeating Djoliba AC in the first match 1-0 as the second had a goal draw.  A total of about 45 goals were scored. Originally a 26 match season, it was reduced to a 22 match season as the Invincible Eleven withdrew during the quarterfinals and then Ranchers Bees during the semis, neither club from the Gambia nor Mauritania participated. Sporting Bissau was the only club who abandoned the tournament during the second match.

Preliminary round

|}

Quarterfinals

|}
The match between Mogas 90 of Benin and the Invincible Eleven were not held as the Invincible Eleven withdrew.

Semifinals

|}
The matches between Djoliba AC and Ranchers Bees were cancelled as Ranchers Bees withdrew

Finals

|}

Winners

See also
1990 African Cup of Champions Clubs
1990 CAF Cup Winners' Cup

Notes

References

External links
Full results of the 1990 WAFU Club Championship at RSSSF

West African Club Championship
1990 in African football